Reema Lagoo (born Nayan Bhadbhade; 21 June 1958 – 18 May 2017) was an Indian theatre and screen actress known for her work in Hindi and Marathi cinema. She began her acting career in the Marathi theatre, after which she became a household name for playing motherly roles in the 1990s and early 2000s. She became a household name after her roles in the 90s classic TV sitcoms Shriman Shrimati (as Kokila Kulkarni) and as Devaki Verma starring opposite Supriya Pilgaonkar in Tu Tu Main Main.

Career

Lagoo's career as an actor began as a child, influenced by her mother, who was a Marathi stage and film actress. She appeared in five films including Masterji, directed by Durga Khote. Her senior career continued in Marathi stage after a long gap following work as a child artiste. It began with her coming to Mumbai and appearing in P. L. Deshpande's play, an adaptation of My Fair Lady. However, she received wider recognition with roles in television serials, Hindi and Marathi films. She debuted in films in 1979 with the Marathi film Sinhasan.

Hindi films 
She went on to play supporting roles with some of the biggest names in the Hindi film industry, mostly as the mother of the lead characters. She first rose to prominence with the Hindi film Qayamat Se Qayamat Tak (1988) where she played Juhi Chawla's mother. She was seen in a controversial role in Aruna Raje's Rihaee (1988). She then starred in the blockbuster film Maine Pyar Kiya (1989) as Salman Khan's mother and then in Saajan (1991), also a superhit success at the box office. She starred in action drama and crime thriller Gumrah (1993) as Sridevi's mother, Jai Kishen (1994) as Akshay Kumar's mother and Rangeela (1995) as Urmila Matondkar's mother. Her Gumrah (1993) was seventh-highest grosser of the year at the box office, Jai Kishen (1994) was a commercial success (declared 'semihit'). Rangeela (1995) was highest grosser of the year at the box office.

Most prominently, she has starred in some of the biggest hits in the Bollywood industry including the Hum Aapke Hain Koun..! (1994), Yeh Dillagi (1994), Dilwale (1994), Rangeela (1995), Kuch Kuch Hota Hai (1998), Kal Ho Naa Ho (2003), Hum Saath-Saath Hain (1999) Vaastav: The Reality (1999)  In this role that won her a fourth Filmfare Award for best supporting actress, Lagoo played mother to gangster Sanjay Dutt. She has been credited in the media as a coming of a "new-age mother" in Hindi cinema.

Though mostly playing a middle-aged mother in films, she has also played other roles earlier in her career. She played the role of a dancer in Aakrosh (1980) and a cold-hearted businesswoman in Yeh Dillagi (1994).

Marathi films 
Lagoo also had a notable presence in Marathi cinema. She was awarded the Maharashtra State Film Award for Best Actress for her performance in the 2002 film Reshamgaath. Her role in Janma (2011), which she referred to as "one of the best roles in her career", received praise. Recognising her contribution to Marathi cinema, she was awarded the V Shantaram Award by the Government of Maharashtra.

Television 
Lagoo also had a fairly successful career as a television actor in both Hindi and Marathi languages. She debuted on television in 1985 with the Hindi series Khandaan. Her roles in Shriman Shrimati as Kokila Kulkarni and as Devaki Verma starring opposite Supriya Pilgaonkar in Tu Tu Main Main were her most successful shows, with the latter winning her the Indian Telly Award for Best Actress in a Comic Role.

Lagoo has appeared on the Marathi show Maanacha Muzra, which honours Marathi personalities.

Personal life
Reema Lagoo was born on 21 June 1958 as Nayan Bhadbhade. Her mother was Marathi stage actress Mandakini Bhadbhade famed for the drama Lekure udand Jaahalee. Lagoo's acting abilities were noted when she was a student at the Huzurpaga HHCP High School in Pune. She took to acting professionally after completing her secondary education. Starting 1979, she was employed with Union Bank of India for ten years in Bombay (now Mumbai), when, alongside appearances in television and films, she participated in the inter-bank cultural events.

She met Vivek Lagoo, her future colleague in the bank and stage actor, in 1976 and married him in 1978. Upon marriage, she adopted the name Reema Lagoo. Described by Vivek as "an understanding to restructure our lives", they separated later. The couple's daughter Mrunmayee is also an actress and theatre director.

Death
Lagoo had been shooting for the television series Naamkarann till 7 p.m. (IST) on 17 May 2017. After she complained of chest pain later that night, she was taken to Kokilaben Dhirubhai Ambani Hospital in Mumbai at 1 a.m. (IST). She died at 3:15 a.m. (IST) from cardiac arrest. At the time of death, she was described as being "perfectly fine" and having "no health issues". Her funeral was performed by her daughter in Oshiwara crematorium, in Mumbai.

Filmography

Films

Television

References

External links
 

1958 births
2017 deaths
20th-century Indian actresses
21st-century Indian actresses
Indian film actresses
Indian television actresses
Actresses in Marathi cinema
Actresses in Hindi cinema
Actresses from Pune
Actresses in Hindi television